{{Infobox royalty
| name         = Hemiunu
| title        = Hereditary Prince 
King's son of his body 
Vizier
| image        = Statue-of-Hemiun.jpg
| caption      = Statue of Hemiunu at the Pelizaeus Museum, Hildesheim, Germany, his feet rest on columns of hieroglyphs painted in yellow, red, brown, and black
| father       = Nefermaat
| mother       = Itet
| native_lang1 = Egyptian name
| native_lang1_name1 = Hm-iwn-w
| dynasty      = Fourth Dynasty of Egypt
}}
Hemiunu (fl. 2570 BC) was an ancient Egyptian prince who is believed to have been the architect of the Great Pyramid of Giza.Shaw, p. 89 As vizier, succeeding his father, Nefermaat, and his uncle, Kanefer, Hemiunu was one of the most important members of the court and responsible for all the royal works. His tomb lies close to Khufu's pyramid.

 Biography 
Hemiunu was a son of prince Nefermaat and his wife, Itet. He is a grandson of Sneferu and a nephew of Khufu, the Old Kingdom pharaoh. Hemiunu had three sisters and many brothers.

In his tomb, he is described as a hereditary prince, count, sealer of the king of Lower Egypt (jrj-pat HAtj-a xtmw-bjtj), and on a statue found in his serdab (and now located in Hildesheim), Hemiunu is given the titles: king's son of his body, chief justice, and vizier, greatest of the five of the House of Thoth (sA nswt n XT=f tAjtj sAb TAtj wr djw pr-DHwtj).

 Tomb 
Hemiunu's tomb lies close to Khufu's pyramid and contains reliefs of his image. Some stones of his badly damaged mastaba are marked with dates referring to Khufu's reign. His statue can be found at the Pelizaeus Museum, Hildesheim, Germany. This statue is scheduled to be loaned for the opening of the Grand Egyptian Museum in late 2022.

His statue was found in the walled-up serdab of Hemiunu's mastaba by archaeologist Hermann Junker in March 1912. Ancient looters had ransacked the mastaba in their quest for valuable items and the wall to the serdab had a child-sized hole cut into it. The robber forcefully gouged out the statue's precious inlaid eyes and gold castings, in the process the right arm was broken and the head severed. The head has been restored, using a relief of Hemiunu as a guide for the nose's profile.

The seated statue is well-preserved, apart from the damage mentioned above, and is notable for its realism, not found in ancient Egyptian art depicting royal figures. Hemiunu's features are only lightly stylized and clearly based on his appearance. He is depicted as obese, with notable accumulation of fat in the pectoral region. This contrasts with the more idealized representation of male subjects in royal portraiture in this and most succeeding periods of ancient Egyptian art.

 Notes 

 References 
 Dieter Arnold, The Encyclopaedia of Ancient Egyptian Architecture, I.B.Tauris, 2002
 Nigel C. Strudwick, Texts from the Pyramid, SBL, 2005
 Cambridge Ancient History by Cambridge University Press, 2000
 Francesco Tiradritti, Arte egizia, Giunti, 2002
 Lyon Sprague De Camp, Catherine Crook De Camp, Ancient Ruins and Archaeology, Doubleday, 1964
 Ian Shaw, The Oxford History of Ancient Egypt'', Oxford University Press, 2003

See also
List of Egyptian architects
 

26th-century BC Egyptian people
Princes of the Fourth Dynasty of Egypt
Viziers of the Fourth Dynasty of Egypt
Ancient Egyptian architects
Giza Plateau
26th-century BC deaths
Great Pyramid of Giza